Shamlu-ye Kuchak (also Romanized as Shāmlū-ye Kūchak; also known as Shāmlūy-e Kūchak and Shāmlū-ye Bālā) is a village in Qeshlaq Rural District, Abish Ahmad District, Kaleybar County, East Azerbaijan Province, Iran. At the 2006 census, its population was 187, in 35 families.

References 

Populated places in Kaleybar County